Cornufer vertebralis is a species of frog in the family Ceratobatrachidae.
It is found in Papua New Guinea and Solomon Islands.
Its natural habitats are subtropical or tropical moist lowland forests, rural gardens, and heavily degraded former forest.
It is threatened by habitat loss.

References

vertebralis
Taxonomy articles created by Polbot
Amphibians described in 1887